Cleomella obtusifolia is a species of flowering plant in the cleome family known by the common name Mojave stinkweed. It is native to the Mojave Desert and adjacent hills, where it grows in alkaline soils in the desert scrub. It is an annual herb producing a rough, hairy stem up to 90 centimeters long. The branching stem grows erect when new and then the branches droop to the ground with age, forming a bushy clump or mat. Each leaf is made up of three fleshy oval leaflets. Flowers appear in dense racemes on older stems and solitary in leaf axils on new stems. Each flower has generally four hairy green sepals and four yellow petals grouped together on one side of the involucre. The whiskery yellow stamens protrude up to 1.5 centimeters from the flower. The fruit is a hairy, valved capsule a few millimeters in length. It hangs at the tip of the remaining flower receptacle.

References

External links
Jepson Manual Treatment
Photo gallery

obtusifolia
Flora of Arizona
Flora of California
Flora of Nevada
Plants described in 1845
Flora without expected TNC conservation status